Schizodiscus is a genus of lichenized fungi within the Lecideaceae family. This is a monotypic genus, containing the single species Schizodiscus afroalpinus.

References

External links
Schizodiscus at Index Fungorum

Lichen genera
Lecideales genera
Taxa described in 1998